Miss America's Outstanding Teen 2015 was the 9th Miss America's Outstanding Teen pageant held at the Linda Chapin Theater in the Orange County Convention Center in Orlando, Florida on August 2, 2014. At the conclusion of the event, Leah Sykes of Florida crowned her successor Olivia McMillan of Georgia. Miss America 2014 Nina Davuluri was a host of the event.

Results

Placements 
{| class="wikitable"
|+
!Final Results
!Contestant(s)
|-
|Miss America's Outstanding Teen 2015
|
  Georgia - Olivia McMillan
|-
|1st runner-up
|
  Tennessee - Lexie Perry
|-
|2nd runner-up
|
  Alabama - Morgan Green
|-
|3rd runner-up
|
  Virginia - Casey Shepard
|-
|4th runner-up
|
  Nebraska - Morgan Holen
|-
|Top 12
|
  Colorado - Abigail Schwartz
  Florida - Michaela McLean
  Michigan - Alisha Gatchel
  North Dakota - Raghen Lucy §
  Pennsylvania - Page Mackenzie Weinstein
  Texas - Kassidy Brown
  Virgin Islands - Cereyna Jade Bougouneau §|}§''' - America's Choice

Awards

Preliminary awards

Non-finalist awards

Talent awards

Children's Miracle Network Hospitals Miracle Maker awards

Teens in Action awards

Top Ad Sales awards

Other awards

Contestants

References

2015
2015 in Florida
2015 beauty pageants